Daniel "Dani" Guillén Ruiz (born 1 October 1984) is a Spanish footballer who plays as a left back.

Club career
Born in Plasencia, Province of Cáceres, Guillén was signed by Real Madrid from another club in the capital, amateurs Las Rozas CF, first representing Real Madrid C. In the 2006–07 season, he made his debut for the B-team in the second division, playing 17 matches as they were relegated; the following year, he contributed even less.

Released by Real Madrid in 2008, Guillén resumed his career in the third level, first with Benidorm CF then UE Sant Andreu, CE L'Hospitalet, CD Atlético Baleares, Burgos CF and CF Fuenlabrada.

References

External links

1984 births
Living people
People from Plasencia
Sportspeople from the Province of Cáceres
Spanish footballers
Footballers from Extremadura
Association football defenders
Segunda División players
Segunda División B players
Tercera División players
Real Madrid C footballers
Real Madrid Castilla footballers
Benidorm CF footballers
UE Sant Andreu footballers
CE L'Hospitalet players
CD Atlético Baleares footballers
Burgos CF footballers
CF Fuenlabrada footballers
Internacional de Madrid players